Borki is a rural locality (a selo) and the administrative center of Borchanskoye Rural Settlement, Valuysky District, Belgorod Oblast, Russia. The population was 655 as of 2010. There are 5 streets.

Geography 
Borki is located 25 km southwest of Valuyki (the district's administrative centre) by road. Babki is the nearest rural locality.

References 

Rural localities in Valuysky District